Pentre-gat is a small village in the community of Llangrannog, Ceredigion, Wales, which is 69.6 miles (112 km) from Swansea and 381 miles (302.3 km) from London. Pentregat is represented in the Senedd by Elin Jones (Plaid Cymru) and is part of the Ceredigion constituency in the House of Commons.

The word derives from the Welsh language: "Village gate".

See also 
 List of localities in Wales by population

References 

Villages in Ceredigion